Tibane is a town in northern Algeria.

Communes of Béjaïa Province